Jarosław Daniel Sellin (born 1 May 1963 in Gdynia) is a Polish politician and journalist. He was elected to the Sejm, the lower house of Polish parliament, on 25 September 2005, getting 18,097 votes in 26 Gdynia district as a candidate from the Law and Justice list.

See also
Members of Polish Sejm 2005-2007

References

External links
Jarosław Sellin - parliamentary page - includes declarations of interest, voting record, and transcripts of speeches.

1963 births
Living people
People from Gdynia
Polish journalists
Law and Justice politicians
University of Gdańsk alumni
Members of the Polish Sejm 2005–2007
Members of the Polish Sejm 2007–2011
Members of the Polish Sejm 2011–2015
Members of the Polish Sejm 2015–2019
Members of the Polish Sejm 2019–2023